Cloondalin is a townland in County Westmeath, Ireland. The townland is in the civil parish of St. Mary's.

The townland stands to the southeast of Athlone, The Dublin–Westport/Galway railway line cuts through the middle of the area, with the N62 road to the east.

References 

Townlands of County Westmeath